David Edward Godin (21 June 1936 – 15 October 2004) was an English fan of American soul music, who made a major contribution internationally in spreading awareness and understanding of the genre, and by extension African-American culture.

Biography
Born in Peckham, London, the son of a milkman, Dave Godin spent his early childhood in Peckham before bombing forced the family to move to Bexleyheath, Kent, where he won a scholarship to Dartford Grammar School. Godin began collecting American R&B records when at school, where he encouraged the younger Mick Jagger's interest in black American music. He said: "..It was at Dartford Grammar School that I met Mick Jagger and introduced him to black music, I'm ashamed to say. It's ironic that as a result of meeting me he's where he is today." Godin played a minor role in the early jam sessions out of which the Rolling Stones emerged, but resented Jagger for what he saw as the Stones' exploitation of black music.

After working at an advertising agency, and as a hospital porter in place of National Service (he was a conscientious objector), Godin founded the Tamla Motown Appreciation Society, and in time was recruited by Berry Gordy to become Motown's consultant in the UK, setting up its distribution through EMI. At a recording of Ready Steady Go! in 1964, Jagger asked Godin to introduce him to Marvin Gaye. "I told him to fuck off and introduce himself", Godin recalled.

In 1967 he founded Soul City, a record shop which in 1967 developed into a record label on which he released such then-obscure soul classics as "Go Now" by Bessie Banks, with colleague David Nathan and friend Robert Blackmore. It was in their shop that Godin coined the term 'northern soul', a description that he would popularise through his work as a music journalist. In a 2002 interview with Chris Hunt of Mojo, he explained that he had first come up with the term in 1968 as a sales reference to help staff in his shop differentiate the more modern funkier sounds from the smoother, Motown-influenced soul of a few years earlier:
"I had started to notice that northern football fans who were in London to follow their team were coming into the store to buy records, but they weren't interested in the latest developments in the black American chart. I devised the name as a shorthand sales term. It was just to say ‘if you’ve got customers from the north, don't waste time playing them records currently in the US black chart, just play them what they like – ‘Northern Soul’."

In his career he also coined the term Deep Soul and he promoted the interests of a large number of American musicians whose work had fallen out of favour in their home country.

His second career was in cinema exhibition. Having studied art, design and film course at Sheffield Polytechnic, he became a senior film officer for the British Film Institute and helped found and was the manager of the Anvil Cinema, Sheffield (1983–90), the only cinema in the UK to be funded by a local authority.

In the mid 1990s he started to compile a series of CDs of rare (and some not so rare) recordings – Dave Godin's Deep Soul Treasures – for Ace Records, which featured such artists as Loretta Williams, Eddie and Ernie, Jaibi, Ruby Johnson and Jimmy and Louise Tig. The four albums were greeted with universal critical acclaim, and Godin described the series as the proudest achievement of his life. A fifth, posthumous, volume was ultimately released in 2019, based on lists of tracks he had considered for inclusion, including material intended for the four previous volumes, for which licensing rights could not be obtained at the time.

Godin, a vegan, was an advocate of animal rights and Esperanto. He was also known for his involvement in anarchist and anti-capitalist organisations, including Freedom Newspaper and Class War. He was the only atheist in his local pro-life organisation. Towards the end of his life he developed an interest in Jainism.  He died in Rotherham in 2004, aged 68.

A biography, Dave Godin: a Northern Soul by Stephen Stevlor, was published in 2020 on the anniversary of Godin's death.

References

Further reading

External links
Guardian obituary by Richard Williams, October 20, 2004
Independent obituary by Phil Johnson, October 20, 2004
Sheffield Today obituary, October 21, 2004
The Times obituary October 26, 2004
The Dave Godin pages on the Soulful Kinda Music Website
The Dave Godin page on the Soul Walking Website

1936 births
2004 deaths
Alumni of Sheffield Hallam University
English anarchists
English atheists
British conscientious objectors
Motown
People educated at Dartford Grammar School
People from Peckham